In public transport, Route 5 may refer to:

North America

Canada 
Line 5 Blue (Montreal Metro)

United States 
5 (New York City Subway service)
5 (New Jersey bus), a New Jersey Transit bus route
Route 5 (MTA Maryland), a bus route in Baltimore, Maryland
5 (Los Angeles Railway), a line operated by the Los Angeles Railway from 1931 to 1958

Europe

Spain 
Barcelona Metro line 5
Line 5 (Madrid Metro)

United Kingdom 
London Buses route 5

Asia

China 
Citybus Route 5, a bus route in Hong Kong

South Korea 
Seoul Subway Line 5

Oceania

Australia 
Melbourne tram route 5

5